The men's pole vault event was part of the track and field athletics programme at the 1948 Summer Olympics. Nineteen athletes from 10 nations competed. The maximum number of athletes per nation had been set at 3 since the 1930 Olympic Congress. The competition was held on July 31 and August 2. During the final, a rainstorm came in during the jumps at 4.10. All the jumpers at 4.20 and higher had to deal with wet conditions on the runway and with their poles. The final was won by American Guinn Smith. Erkki Kataja had held the lead with a perfect set of jumps until Smith's last attempt clearance of 4.30. Smith's win was the United States' 11th consecutive victory in the men's pole vault. Kataja's silver was Finland's first medal in the event.

Background

This was the 11th appearance of the event, which is one of 12 athletics events to have been held at every Summer Olympics. The only returning vaulter from the pre-war 1936 Games was sixth-place finisher Richard Webster of Great Britain. American Cornelius Warmerdam had dominated the pole vault during World War II, breaking the world record three times and increasing the record a total of 23 centimetres; however, he had retired in 1944. Boo Morcom was the favorite in London, having won the 1945, 1947, and 1948 AAU championships (the last tied with Bob Richards) and tied the Olympic trials with Guinn Smith. However, Morcom was injured at the Games.

Iceland and Puerto Rico each made their first appearance in the event. The United States made its 11th appearance, the only nation to have competed at every Olympic men's pole vault to that point.

Competition format

The competition used the two-round format introduced in 1912, with results cleared between rounds. Vaulters received three attempts at each height. For the first time (other than the impromptu decision in 1936 after two Japanese vaulters refused to jump-off against each other), ties were broken by fewest misses.

In the qualifying round, the bar was set at heights including 3.60 metres, 3.70 metres, 3.80 metres, 3.90 metres, and 4.00 metres. All vaulters clearing 4.00 metres advanced to the final.

In the final, the bar was set at heights of 3.60 metres, 3.80 metres, 3.95 metres, 4.10 metres, 4.20 metres, 4.30 metres, and 4.40 metres.

Records

Prior to the competition, the existing world and Olympic records were as follows.

No new world or Olympic records were set during the competition.

Schedule

All times are British Summer Time (UTC+1)

Results

Qualifying round

Qual. rule: qualification standard 4.00m (Q) or at least best 12 qualified (q).

Final

All vaulters cleared or passed at 3.60 metres and 3.80 metres; jump sequences for those heights are not available.

References

External links
Organising Committee for the XIV Olympiad, The (1948). The Official Report of the Organising Committee for the XIV Olympiad. LA84 Foundation. Retrieved 5 September 2016.

Athletics at the 1948 Summer Olympics
Pole vault at the Olympics
Men's events at the 1948 Summer Olympics